Self-healing papular mucinosis is a skin condition caused by fibroblasts producing abnormally large amounts of mucopolysaccharides, and may present in adult and juvenile forms.  The juvenile variant is also called self-healing juvenile cutaneous mucinosis.

See also 
 Papular mucinosis
 List of cutaneous conditions

References 

Mucinoses